Dávid Škutka (born 25 May 1988) is a Slovak football striker.

Škutka is a versatile forward who starting began his career as a second striker but now usually playing as a centre-forward.

Club career
He started off its career in hometown club MFK Snina. Later he was joined to MFK Košice. He netted for MFK Košice jersey, overall 28 goals in 126 matches. In January 2013, he was transferred to Czech team SK Slavia Prague as the 2nd Corgoň Liga topscorer with 13 goals. He signed a three and half year contract.

Career statistics

External links
 MFK Košice profile

References

1988 births
Living people
People from Snina
Sportspeople from the Prešov Region
Association football forwards
Slovak footballers
FC VSS Košice players
SK Slavia Prague players
FC Baník Ostrava players
FK Železiarne Podbrezová players
Spartak Myjava players
MFK Zemplín Michalovce players
Slovak Super Liga players
Czech First League players
Expatriate footballers in the Czech Republic